Tutong or officially known as Tutong Town is a municipality town in Mukim Pekan Tutong Tutong District, Brunei.

Governance 
The members consist of government officers, the penghulu of Mukim Pekan Tutong, and appointed representatives from the local residents, organisations and business community. The main responsibility, through the Tutong Municipal Department, is collecting revenue from taxation of building, commercial licence fees and rental of commercial lots in commercial centres owned by the Department.

Petani and Bukit Bendera are village-level subdivisions, the third and lowest administrative divisions in the country, and administered under Tutong District Office, another department in the Ministry of Home Affairs. Petani and Bukit Bendera constitute parts of Pekan Tutong subdistrict.

History 

In 1900, the town only consisted of four or five simple houses with several small shops. The earliest governmental building was constructed in 1910, followed by a school being opened in 1918. Oil exploration within the district began in 1913, and by 1923, Brunei Shell Petroleum (BSP) already had 8 exploratory holes drilled. The Brunei-Tutong road was officially opened in 1927. The town was first incorporated in 1929 as a Sanitary Board area and had the responsibility of monitoring cleanliness and development in the town.

On 16 December 1941, the first landing by the Japanese Kawaguchi Detachment at Seria as part of the Battle of Borneo during World War II. Occupation of Brunei came to an end when the Australian 9th Division came ashore at Muara during Operation Oboe Six on 10 June 1945. The Tutong Bridge was finally completed in 1959, thus ferries are not required to carry passengers to cross the Tutong River. 

During the 1962 Brunei revolt, rebels of the TKNU managed to gain control of the town. A convoy of Land Rovers with soldiers from the 1/2nd Battalion Royal Gurkha Rifles were ambushed as they passed through the town while heading to Seria. Gunfires were exchanged from the town's police station which led to several Gurkhas being injured.  

The government rushed to allocate and develop the area which are necessary and in convenience of the local population in 1967. Government building were also replaced with a newer B$500,000 building. Other buildings that were built are; a community hall, playground, police station, fire station, carpentry school, english elementary school, telecom building and guest houses for district officer and village head. Additionally to increase the standard of living, roads have been paved, bridges and wells were built. 

Since 1970, the Board has become known as Tutong Municipal Board. In 1973, the Sungai Tutong Water Supply Scheme got rid of water defects to Bandar Seri Begawan.

Infrastructures 
On 3 December 2012, the National Isolation Centre (NIC) was officially opened in town. During the COVID-19 pandemic in Brunei, the NIC has reached full capacity within a day on 14 August 2021.

Education 

 Muda Hashim Primary School (Public) 
 Chung Hwa Tutong School (Private)
 Pertama Tutong School (Private)
 Muda Hashim Secondary School (Public)
 Sufri Bolkiah Secondary School (Public) 
 Ma'had Islam Brunei (Public)

There is no sixth form centre in Tutong town. However, sixth form education is at Tutong Sixth Form Centre, which serves the whole of Tutong District.

Tourist attractions 

 Tutong Market is a wet market. It is located outside of the municipal area, that is in Serambangun, but it is managed by the Municipal Department.
 Hassanal Bolkiah Mosque is the sole mosque serving the Muslim residents of Tutong, as well as a few surrounding villages, namely Panchor Dulit, Panchor Papan and Serambangun.
 Mercu Tanda Kenangan (also known as The Keris Monument) is a monument to commemorate the Sultan Hassanal Bolkiah's 58th birthday in 2004.
 Warisan Emas is a monument to commemorate the Sultan Hassanal Bolkiah's 60th birthday in 2006.
 Istana Pantai is a palace built by Omar Ali Saifuddien III in the 1950s.

Recreation 

 Tutong Sports Complex offers facilities for conducting various types of sports, including football, athletics, swimming, tennis, badminton and basketball.

See also
Nak Pulau

References 

Tutong District
Tutong
Municipalities in Brunei